Anomodontia is an extinct group of non-mammalian therapsids from the Permian and Triassic periods. By far the most speciose group are the dicynodonts, a clade of beaked, tusked herbivores. Anomodonts were very diverse during the Middle Permian, including primitive forms like Anomocephalus and Patranomodon and groups like Venyukovioidea and Dromasauria. Dicynodonts became the most successful and abundant of all herbivores in the Late Permian, filling ecological niches ranging from large browsers down to small burrowers. Few dicynodont families survived the Permian–Triassic extinction event, but one lineage (Kannemeyeriiformes) evolved into large, stocky forms that became dominant terrestrial herbivores right until the Late Triassic, when changing conditions caused them to decline, finally going extinct during the Triassic–Jurassic extinction event.

Classification

Taxonomy
 Order Therapsida
 Suborder Anomodontia
 Biseridens
 Patranomodon
 Clade Anomocephaloidea
 Anomocephalus
 Tiarajudens
 Infraorder Venyukovioidea
 Otsheria
 Parasuminia
 Suminia
 Ulemica
 Venyukovia
 Clade Chainosauria
 ?Galechirus
 Galeops
 Galepus
 Infraorder Dicynodontia

Phylogeny
Cladogram modified from Cisneros et al., 2015.

Cladogram modified from Angielczyk and Kammerer (2017):

See also
 Theriodont
 Dinocephalia
 Biarmosuchians
 Evolution of mammals

References

 
Fossil taxa described in 1859
Guadalupian first appearances
Late Triassic extinctions
Taxa named by Richard Owen